Powder Springs is a city in Cobb County, Georgia, United States. The population was 13,940 at the 2010 census, with an estimated population for 2019 of 15,758. In 2015, the city elected its first black mayor, Al Thurman. He was the first African-American to be elected as a mayor in Cobb County, but was one of several elected in small towns in Georgia in 2015. The 12,000-capacity Walter H. Cantrell Stadium is located in Powder Springs. It is used mostly for football and soccer matches.

History 

The town of Powder Springs was incorporated as Springville in 1838 in the lands of two Cherokee Indian leaders. Gold had been discovered in Georgia ten years earlier, and the first European-American settlers came to find gold. The settlers found little gold in the mines at Lost Mountain and off Brownsville Road. It was at about this time that the Cherokee people were forced off their land and removed to Indian Territory west of the Mississippi River on the Trail of Tears.

Springville was renamed as Powder Springs in 1859. The name was derived from the seven springs in the city limits. The water in these springs contains some 26 minerals that turn the surrounding sand black like gunpowder – hence the earlier name of Gunpowder Springs.

Civil War history includes a skirmish at Lattermore's Mills on June 20, 1864, that was a part of the Battle of Kennesaw Mountain and General Sherman's Atlanta Campaign. Many slaves escaped the plantations in this area to join Sherman's forces and gain freedom.

Geography
Powder Springs is located in southwestern Cobb County at  (33.865933, -84.680349).

Demographics

2020 census

As of the 2020 United States census, there were 16,887 people, 5,125 households, and 3,899 families residing in the city.

2000 census
As of the census of 2000, there were 12,481 people, 4,004 households, and 3,267 families residing in the city. There were 4,101 housing units at an average density of  The racial makeup of the city was 57.89% African American, 37.38% Caucasian, 0.20% Native American, 1.08% Asian, 0.06% Pacific Islander, 1.72% from other races, and 1.67% from two or more races. Hispanic or Latino of any race were 4.32% of the population.

There were 4,004 households, out of which 50.7% had children under the age of 18 living with them, 60.2% were married couples living together, 16.9% had a female householder with no husband present, and 18.4% were non-families. 14.7% of all households were made up of individuals. The average household size was 3.06 and the average family size was 3.39.

In the city, the population was spread out, with 33.8% under the age of 18, 6.6% from 18 to 24, 36.9% from 25 to 44, 16.3% from 45 to 64, and 6.3% who were 65 years of age or older.  The median age was 32 years. For every 100 females, there were 90.0 males.  For every 100 females age 18 and over, there were 82.3 males.

The median income for a household in the city was $56,486, and the median income for a family was $59,392. Males had a median income of $41,345 versus $31,774 for females. The per capita income for the city was $19,776.  About 5.8% of families and 8.5% of the population were below the poverty line, including 11.8% of those under age 18 and 6.2% of those age 65 or over.

Parks and recreation
Powder Springs Park
Powder Springs Trail System
Silver Comet Trail

Education

Powder Springs Public Schools are part of the Cobb County School District, and is home to McEachern High School, located on the site of the former Native American burial ground and the former Seventh District Agricultural and Mechanical (A&M) School.

The late Georgia Senator Richard B. Russell attended the Seventh District A&M School. The administrative building of McEachern High School is named for Senator Russell.

Other schools serving Powder Springs include Hillgrove High School, Tapp Middle School, Dobbins Middle School, Powder Springs Elementary School, Lovinggood Middle School, Varner Elementary, Compton Elementary, Kemp Elementary, Still Elementary, and Vaughan Elementary.

Media
The Bright Side is a newspaper serving Powder Springs and several other small cities.

The Citywide Blog www.purelypowdersprings.com covers all things fun and local tourism.

Notable people

Rory Anderson (born 1992), former NFL tight end, selected in seventh round of 2015 NFL Draft; played college football at South Carolina
Gregg Bishop, film director, screenwriter and producer; born in Powder Springs 
Pat Cannon (1904–1966), United States Representative from Florida; born in Powder Springs
Kenyan Drake (born 1994), running back for Baltimore Ravens of National Football League, selected in third round of 2016 NFL Draft; played college football at Alabama, where he was a three-time SEC champion (2012, 2014, 2015), a BCS national champion (2012), and CFP national champion (2015).
Chuma Edoga (born 1997), offensive tackle for the Atlanta Falcons
Evan Engram (born 1994), tight end for Jacksonville Jaguars, selected in first round of 2017 NFL Draft; played college football at Ole Miss
Mark Lee (born 1973), guitarist for Christian rock band Third Day, born in Powder Springs
Jason Lively (born 1967), actor, born in Powder Springs
Robyn Lively (born 1972), actress; born in Powder Springs
Shaquell Moore (born 1996), professional soccer player for Nashville SC, and the United States Men's National Team.
Al Thurman, businessman and politician, City Council member for 13 years, first black mayor of city, elected in 2015
Taylor Trammell (born 1997), outfielder for Seattle Mariners
Tiffany Whitton (born 1987), woman who lived in Powder Springs at the time of her 2013 disappearance.

References

External links
 
City of Powder Springs official website
Powder Springs at City-Data.com

Cities in Georgia (U.S. state)
Cities in Cobb County, Georgia
1838 establishments in Georgia (U.S. state)